Chauncey N. Olds was a Republican politician from the state of Ohio. He was Ohio Attorney General 1865.

Biography
Chauncey Olds was born February 2, 1816, at Marlboro, Vermont, brother of Edson B. Olds. He was moved to Cuyahoga County, Ohio, at age four. In 1830, the family moved to Circleville, Pickaway County. He began studies at Ohio University that autumn, but quit after three years due to illness. He entered Miami University in 1834, graduated in 1836, and soon became a professor there. He resigned in 1840, studied law, and was admitted to the bar in 1842 in Circleville. He practiced in that town until 1856, and represented the county in the Ohio House of Representatives for the 47th General Assembly, 1848–1849, and the Ohio State Senate 1849-1850, elected as a Whig. In 1856 he moved to Columbus, Ohio, and ran for Ohio Attorney General in the 1862 election, but lost.

In 1865, Attorney General William P. Richardson resigned, and Olds was appointed by Governor Brough, February 20, 1865. He was not nominated for the 1865 election. He was a trustee of Miami University for twenty five years. He was prominent in the Presbyterian church. For the last seventeen years of his life he represented the Pittsburgh, Cincinnati and St. Louis Railway in Franklin County. He died February 11, 1890, at his home in Columbus.

Notes

References

1816 births
1890 deaths
People from Marlboro, Vermont
Ohio Whigs
19th-century American politicians
Ohio Republicans
Ohio Attorneys General
Members of the Ohio House of Representatives
Ohio state senators
People from Circleville, Ohio
Politicians from Columbus, Ohio
Ohio lawyers
Miami University alumni
Miami University trustees
Ohio University alumni
Lawyers from Columbus, Ohio
American Presbyterians
19th-century American lawyers